In This World is the 1988 album from Cindytalk released by Midnight Music. Released as two different LPs under the same name. The CD contains all the tracks from both LPs in order. The LPs and the CD all feature different covers from the same image series. "Janey's Love" features an uncredited reading by Kathy Acker from her novel Blood And Guts In High School. "My Sun" features a sample from Jean-Luc Godard's Vivre Sa Vie. "Playtime" differs from the version on the Abstract Magazine Issue 5 compilation.

CD Track listing
 In This World (7:04)
 Janey's Love (3:12)
 Gift of a Knife (3:31)
 Playtime (4:46)
 The Room of Delight (1:37)
 Touched (4:06)
 Circle of Shit (6:28)
 My Sun (1:51)
 The Beginning of Wisdom (6:45)
 No Serenade (7:28)
 Sight After Sight (6:11)
 Angels or Ghosts (2:43)
 Through Water (9:02)
 Cherish (1:14)
 Homeless (1:27)
 Still Whisper (1:27)
 In This World... (3:08)

Gordon Sharp - voice and piano
John Byrne - instruments
Alex Wright - instruments
Debbie Wright - saxophone on "Janey's Love", "Circle of Shit", "The Room of Delight";
clarinet on "Through Water"
Produced by Cindytalk and Iain O'Higgins, except "Playtime" and "My Sun," co-produced and engineered by Derek Birkett.
Malou - accordion on "Cherish", "Homeless", "Still Whisper"
Ivan Unwin - treated harmonica on "No Serenade"; feedback guitar on "Circle of Shit"
Paget - second voice on "In This World"

Versions
 LP, 1988, Midnight Music, Cat# CHIME 00.27 S (Containing tracks 1-9 above)
 LP, 1988, Midnight Music, Cat# CHIME 00.28 S (Containing tracks 10-17 above)
 CD, 1988, Midnight Music, Cat# CHIME 00.27/28 CD
 CD, 1995, Touched Recordings/World Serpent, Cat# Touch 2
 2LP, 2007, Wheesht, Cat# scratch703
 CD, 2007, Wheesht, Cat# SHH703

1988 albums
Cindytalk albums